Since early ages, Coimbra developed into an important cultural centre, firstly due to the school founded in 1131 in the Santa Cruz Monastery, essential on medieval times and a meeting point for the intellectual and power elites, where famous medieval figures studied, like Saint Anthony of Lisbon. Later the city saw its educational and cultural importance greatly improved because of the establishment of the University of Coimbra which was founded in the 13th century in Lisbon, was moved in 1308 for the first time to Coimbra and was settled definitely in the city in 1537. For this old tradition in education, Coimbra is called A cidade dos estudantes (The city of the students) and Lusa-Atenas (Lusitanic-Athens, after Athens in Greece), because it is a center of culture and erudition, as well as the site of the oldest university which turned Coimbra into a noted university town.

Basic and secondary education 
The city has a large number of public and private basic and secondary schools, among these some of the best-ranked in the country, like Escola Secundária Infanta D. Maria (public) and Colégio Rainha Santa Isabel (private), as well as several kindergartens and nurseries.

The state-run secondary schools and 2nd and 3rd cycle of basic education schools in the municipality of Coimbra are the following:
Escola básica dos 2º e 3º ciclos Dra. Maria Alice Gouveia
Escola básica dos 2º e 3º ciclos de Inês de Castro 
Escola básica dos 2º e 3º ciclos de Taveiro 
Escola básica dos 2º e 3º ciclos de Ceira 
Escola básica dos 2º e 3º ciclos da Pedrulha 
Escola básica dos 2º e 3º ciclos de Eugénio de Castro 
Escola secundária de D. Duarte 
Escola secundária de Jaime Cortesão 
Escola secundária de Avelar Brotero 
Escola secundária com 3º ciclo do ensino básico de D. Dinis 
Escola secundária Infanta D. Maria 
Escola secundária com 3º ciclo do ensino básico da Quinta das Flores 
Escola básica dos 2º e 3º ciclos de S. Silvestre 
Escola básica dos 2º e 3º ciclos de Martim de Freitas 
Escola secundária de José Falcão 
Escola básica dos 2º e 3º ciclos do Poeta Manuel da Silva Gaio

There is also the Coimbra Hotel and Tourism School.

Tertiary education

Public university 

The University of Coimbra, a public university, is one of the oldest universities in continuous operation in Europe and the world, the oldest university in Portuguese-speaking countries, and one of the largest higher education and research institutions of Portugal. It is organized into eight different faculties according to a wide range of fields, granting all the highest academic degrees in architecture, education, engineering, humanities, law, mathematics, medicine, natural sciences, psychology, social sciences and sports. It is among the Portuguese higher education institutions with the highest selectiveness and the largest number of applicants every year. It demands high entrance exam scores for admission into a large number of its most reputed departments.

Public polytechnic 
The Instituto Politécnico de Coimbra (Polytechnical Institute of Coimbra), a public institution of polytechnic higher education in Coimbra, has been in operation since 1988, although some of its current schools were providing degrees independently since the 1970s, and even before some were technical or vocational schools (for instance, the agriculture school - Escola Superior Agrária de Coimbra - whose origins can be dated back to the 19th century, or the current engineering institute - Instituto Superior de Engenharia de Coimbra - formerly an industrial school of intermediate education in operation between 1965 and 1974). It comprises several autonomous schools in engineering, education, accountancy, and agriculture, whose entrance and teaching requirements were less demanding than the University of Coimbra's until the adoption of several new selective admission criteria in 2005 (access rules to state-run institutions have enforced minimum grades of 95/200 in the national access examinations for all students nationwide) and a number of gradual changes in the Portuguese higher education initiated in 1998 - particularly the right to start providing licenciatura degrees like the universities, the enforced minimum grades in the access examinations since 2005, and finally, a gradual shift towards the Bologna process in 2006 and 2007. Its schools currently have a number of reputed courses which are as selective or popular as certain average department's courses of the University of Coimbra, and in general they are allowed to award comparable degrees in some fields, excluding doctorate degrees.

Other institutions 
The Escola Superior de Enfermagem de Coimbra, a public nursing school providing degrees since the 1990s, but whose origins as a nursing and health training school can be dated back to the early 20th century, is other state-run learning institution in the city. 

There are also private higher learning schools and institutes such as the Instituto Superior Miguel Torga, the Instituto Superior Bissaya Barreto, the Escola Universitária das Artes de Coimbra, and the Escola Universitária Vasco da Gama, which are not generally considered as prestigious as the old university, but some are noted for awarding degrees in fields not offered by it.

The city hosts also a regional branch of the Aberta University "Open University", a state-run institution of distance education.

The long history and reputation of the University of Coimbra caused several newer public and private institutions of higher education created after 1974, to unofficially attach themselves to the good name and notability of the historical old university in order to boost its marketing efforts and promote their image among potential students interested for studying in the city. This also happened with a few degrees offered by the old university itself which were never particularly reputed neither for strict selectiveness nor distinctive teaching standards (like, for example, UC's degrees in mining and geological engineering which were discontinued in the early 2000s due to lack of curricular academic integrity).

Student traditions 
Born in the old University of Coimbra, the Festa das Latas and the Queima das Fitas are two important student festivities in the city, and are part of the praxe académica (academic praxis) of Coimbra.

In general, almost all students from the different public and private institutions present today in the city, adopt and internally adapt the traditional student rituals and celebrate the festivities born in the ancient University of Coimbra (UC) like the praxe académica and the Queima das Fitas which are yearly organized by UC's students. Non-UC students are invited to participate in the UC's public parties like Queima das Fitas and Festa das Latas parades through the streets of the town and in addition have their own adaptations for the rituals that are performed independently by school/institute.

See also
Education in Portugal